Faye Wong (born 1969) is a Chinese recording artist and actress.

Faye Wong may also refer to:
Faye Wong (1997 album), a Faye Wong album
Faye Wong (2001 album), a Faye Wong album
"Faye Wong", a song by J Church from Altamont '99
"Faye Wong", a song by Green Club Riviera from The Boring Days Are Over Now

See also
Faye Wong discography
Wang Fei (disambiguation)